Line 1 of the Madrid Metro is an underground metro line running from Pinar de Chamartín in the north to Valdecarros in the southeast, via Sol. Today it has 33 stations (more than any other line on the Madrid Metro) and spans  from end to end.

The line was the first metro line of the Madrid Metro, and the first metro line built in all of Spain. It originally contained only 8 stops connecting Cuatro Caminos in the north to the city center at Puerta del Sol. Line 1 marks the start of the Madrid Metro with its inauguration on 17 October 1919 and public service beginning 14 days later on 31 October. There have been various extensions to the line since it opened including the most recent northern extension to Pinar de Chamartin on 11 April 2007 and a southern extension on 16 May 2007 to Valdecarros.

Line 1 is the second busiest line on the Madrid Metro, behind Line 6, with more than 7.5 million monthly trips.

History

Original line
The Line 1 was the first line of the Madrid Metro, and was inaugurated on 17 October 1919. It was opened to the public on 31 October 1919.

It was extended from 

Early extensions

Between 1964 and 1966, station platforms were extended from 60 meters to 90 meters in order to allow 6-car trains, due to heavy increasing passenger flow. This resulted in the closing of Chamberí station, whose platforms could not be lengthened due to it being located on a sharp curve near Iglesia station. The old Chamberí station, however, was reopened to the public in 2008 as part of the Madrid Metro's  project, now functioning primarily as a historic exhibition.

Recent improvements
In recent years, the line has been extended both north and south. Firstly, in 1988 Atocha Renfe was added between the stations of Atocha and Menéndez Pelayo to serve the new long-distance rail station of Atocha.  On 1 April 1994, it was extended from Portazgo to Miguel Hernández and on 4 March 1999 from Miguel Hernández to Congosto.

In 2007, the line was extended to Pinar de Chamartin in two stages. First, on 30 March 2007, the line was extended from Plaza de Castilla to Chamartin, which provides interchange with Line 10 and RENFE services. The new metro complex has line 1 and in the future, line 11 on the lower level and line 10 on the upper level. On 11 April 2007 the extension to Pinar de Chamartin was completed. Here, there is interchange available to Line 4. There are two side platforms for arrivals and an island platform for departures. In May 2007, interchange to Metro Ligero 1 was available, which terminates one level higher.

On 16 May 2007, the line was extended south from Congosto to Valdecarros with two intermediate stations.

The Line 1 was closed for reforms from 3 July 2016 to October 2016. 25 of the 33 stations were closed for a €70 million refurbishment project meant to modernize the line, the oldest in the system, and repair tunnel linings and replacing power cables. Replacement buses were offered to patrons during the closure.

Rolling stock
Since the summer of 2007, the line uses CAF class 2000A rolling stock trains.

Stations

See also
 Madrid
 Transport in Madrid
 List of Madrid Metro stations
 List of metro systems

References

External links

  Madrid Metro (official website)
 Schematic map of the Metro network – from the official site 
 Madrid at UrbanRail.net
 ENGLISH User guide, ticket types, airport supplement and timings
 Network map (real-distance)
 Madrid Metro Map

01 (Madrid Metro)
Railway lines opened in 1919
1919 establishments in Spain